Kavanayen Airport  is an airstrip serving Kavanayén, an isolated village in the Bolívar State of Venezuela.

See also

Transport in Venezuela
List of airports in Venezuela

References

External links 
OpenStreetMap - Kavanayen 
OurAirports - Kavanayen Airport
FallingRain - Kavanayen Airport

Airports in Venezuela
Bolívar (state)